Even may refer to:

General
 Even (given name), a Norwegian male personal name
 Even (surname)
 Even (people), an ethnic group from Siberia and Russian Far East
Even language, a language spoken by the Evens
 Odd and Even, a solitaire game which is played with two decks of playing cards

Science and technology
In mathematics, the term even is used in several senses related to odd:
 even and odd numbers, an integer is even if dividing by two yields an integer
 even and odd functions, a function is even if f(−x) = f(x) for all x
 even and odd permutations, a permutation of a finite set is even if it is composed of an even number of transpositions
Singly even number, an integer divisible by 2 but not divisible by 4
 Even code, if the Hamming weight of all of a binary code's codewords is even

Entertainment
Even (band), an Australian alternative rock band

See also
Evens (disambiguation)